Benjamin Goodhue (September 20, 1748July 28, 1814) was a Representative and a Senator from Massachusetts.  He supported the Patriot during the American Revolution, and was a strong member of the Federalist Party.  He was described by contemporaries as a leading member of the so-called Essex Junto, a group of Massachusetts Federalists, most of whom were from Essex County.

Biography
Benjamin Goodhue was born in Salem in the Province of Massachusetts Bay to Benjamin and Martha (Hardy) Goodue.  His father was a blacksmith by trade, but later became a successful merchant.  The younger Benjamin graduated from Harvard College in 1766 and joined his father in the merchant business.  He remained active as a merchant during the American Revolutionary War, and was a member of the state constitutional conventions of 1779 and 1780, the latter one producing the present Constitution of Massachusetts.  He then won election as a state representative to the inaugural Massachusetts House of Representatives in 1780, and was later elected to the state senate, serving in 1783 and 1786–1788.  After adoption of the United States Constitution, Goodhue was elected to the First and to the three succeeding Congresses and served from March 4, 1789, until his resignation in June 1796.

Goodhue was a supporter of the strong central government, and joined the Federalist Party when it was organized. He was one of a number of prominent Federalists from Essex County that were described by John Hancock as the "Essex Junto".  He was one of two Congressmen who drafted the nation's first revenue code.  He served as chairman of the Committee on Commerce and Manufactures in the Fourth United States Congress. He was elected in 1796 to the United States Senate, filling a vacancy caused by the resignation of George Cabot. He was reelected and served from June 11, 1796, to November 8, 1800, when he resigned and retired from public service. He died in Salem on July 28, 1814.

Legacy
Goodhue is buried in Salem's Broad Street Cemetery. A World War II Liberty ship was named in his honor.

Notes

References

External links

1748 births
1814 deaths
Harvard College alumni
Massachusetts state senators
Members of the Massachusetts House of Representatives
United States senators from Massachusetts
Federalist Party United States senators
Federalist Party members of the United States House of Representatives from Massachusetts
Politicians from Salem, Massachusetts
Burials at Broad Street Cemetery
People of colonial Massachusetts
18th-century American politicians